Animaker Inc. is a DIY video animation software. The software is cloud-based, and was launched in 2014. It allows users to create animated videos using pre-built characters and templates. In 2017, Animaker became the first tool to launch an animated vertical video creator. The name "Animaker" is a portmanteau of the words "Animation" and "Maker".

Background

Animaker is a cloud-based video and animation software first launched in an open beta version in 2014.

In February 2015, the software was officially launched based on a freemium model that allowed users a free account option.

The software provides online tools to create and edit video animation. The software was developed by Animaker Inc., a video based SaaS company founded by RS Raghavan.
 
Animaker is built on HTML5 and helps users create animated videos that can be exported to Facebook, YouTube or downloaded as an MP4 file.

Products
 Picmaker: DIY graphic designing tool especially made for creating YouTube thumbnails and channel art.
 Animaker Class: DIY video maker for students to create animated videos and posters.
 Animaker iOS app: A video-making app to create and edit videos.

References

External links
 Animaker website

Internet properties established in 2014
Cloud applications
Animation software
IOS software
Video software
Video editing software
2014 software